Dauernd jetzt (Continuously now) is the 14th full-length album by German singer Herbert Grönemeyer, released in November 2014. It was recorded in Saint-Rémy-de-Provence in France as well as in Berlin, Stockholm, and New York City. It was produced by Alex Silva and Herbert Grönemeyer as all albums have been since Bleibt alles anders in 1998.

The album reached #1 position in the German, Austrian, and Swiss charts as well as #65 in the Netherlands. The lead single was "Morgen", released on 7 November 2014, peaking at #5 in Germany, #8 in Austria, and #12 in Switzerland, followed by "Fang mich an" on 27 February 2015 which peaked at #41 in Germany.

Track listing

Charts

Weekly charts

Year-end charts

Certifications

References

2014 albums
German-language albums
EMI Records albums
Herbert Grönemeyer albums
Albums produced by Alex Silva